is a railway station on the Misumi Line, operated by Kyushu Railway Company. Based in Uto, Kumamoto, Japan.

Railway stations in Kumamoto Prefecture
Railway stations in Japan opened in 1931